Lassi Hiekkala (23 November 1888 in Kuopion maalaiskunta – 5 October 1951; name until 1907 Lauri Hoffrén) was a Finnish journalist and politician. He began his political career in the Agrarian League. He was later elected to the Parliament of Finland, where he represented the National Progressive Party from 1945 to 1951 and the People's Party of Finland in 1951.

References

1888 births
1951 deaths
People from Kuopio
People from Kuopio Province (Grand Duchy of Finland)
Centre Party (Finland) politicians
National Progressive Party (Finland) politicians
People's Party of Finland (1951) politicians
Members of the Parliament of Finland (1945–48)
Members of the Parliament of Finland (1948–51)
Finnish people of World War II